Canalı (also, Canallı and Dzhanaly) is a village and municipality in the Qazakh Rayon of Azerbaijan.  It has a population of 1,472.

References 

Populated places in Qazax District